Nadezhdenskoye is a rural locality (a selo) in Priozerny Selsoviet of Ivanovsky District, Amur Oblast, Russia. The population was 83 as of 2018.

Geography 
Nadezhdenskoye is located 22 km north of Ivanovka (the district's administrative centre) by road. Novoalexeyevka is the nearest rural locality.

References 

Rural localities in Ivanovsky District, Amur Oblast